

Qualification timeline

* This event was scheduled for February, but was postponed due to the 2011 Egyptian protests.

50 m rifle 3 positions men

50 m rifle prone men

10 m air rifle men

50 m pistol men

25 m rapid fire pistol men

10 m air pistol men

Trap men

Double trap men

Skeet men

50 m rifle 3 positions women

10 m air rifle women

25 m pistol women

10 m air pistol women

Trap women

Skeet women

References 

Qualification for the 2012 Summer Olympics